The Membership Libraries Group is an organization of non-profit membership libraries in the U.S., formed in 1991.

Membership libraries are rare in the United States today. Although numerous in the 18th and 19th centuries, they declined after the American Civil War, when the free public library as we know it today developed.

A handful — as few as 16 and as many as 24, depending on classification — are known today and continue to thrive. Most are in older cities, where they may preserve architecturally significant buildings and hold special collections of rare books, prints, maps, photographs, and manuscripts of interest to scholars.

Founding
In April 1991, a support group for membership libraries was formed in New York, hosted by the Mercantile Library and its director, Harold Augenbraum. The twelve libraries in attendance chose the name Membership Libraries Group.

It was decided that the Membership Libraries Group (MLG) would meet annually in the fall, at a different member institution each year. Attendees at the meetings would exchange ideas and discuss issues especially pertinent to membership libraries. The twelve institutions in attendance, and their respective directors, were declared the Founding Members of the MLG. They were:

 The Athenaeum Music & Arts Library, San Diego, CA, Christine Mitchell, Executive Director
 The Athenaeum of Philadelphia, Philadelphia, PA, Dr. Sandra Tatman, Executive Director
 The Boston Athenaeum, Boston, MA, Leah Rosovsky, Director 
 The General Society Library, New York, NY, Marjorie Peters, Librarian
 The Mechanics Institute Library, San Francisco, CA, Kimberly Scrafano, CEO
 The Mercantile Library of Cincinnati, Cincinnati, OH, John Faherty, Executive Director
 The Center for Fiction (formerly known as The Mercantile Library) of New York City, New York, NY, Noreen Tomassi, Director
 The New York Society Library, New York, NY, Carolyn Waters, Librarian
 The Portsmouth Athenaeum, Portsmouth, NH, Tom Hardiman, Keeper
 The Providence Athenaeum, Providence, RI, Matt Burrieschi, Executive Director
 The Redwood Library and Athenaeum, Newport, RI, Benedict Leca, Ph.D, Executive Director
 The St. Louis Mercantile Library Association, St. Louis, MO, John Neal Hoover, Executive Director

Other members were later added (see below). To be an active and voting Member, an institution must be financially self-supporting, can not be part of a larger organization, and must provide a circulating library to its members. Some libraries fill some, but not all, of these criteria; they may be accepted as Associate Members.

Conference locations
Today there are 16 full voting Members of the MLG and 5 Associate Members. Each one has celebrated more than 100 years in existence, with four having survived for 250 years or more. Since the founding meeting, MLG conferences have been held in the following locations:

 1991: Boston, MA
 1992: Philadelphia, PA
 1993: Cincinnati, OH
 1994: San Diego, CA
 1995: Charleston, SC
 1996: St. Louis, MO
 1997: New York, NY, The New York Society Library
 1998: Newport, RI
 1999: San Francisco, CA
 2000: Portsmouth, NH
 2001: Tryon, NC
 2002: Boston, MA
 2003: New York, NY, The Mercantile Library 
 2004: Philadelphia, PA
 2005: St. Johnsbury, VT
 2006: Salem, MA
 2007: San Diego, CA
 2008: Newport, RI
 2009: Charleston, SC
 2010: Cincinnati, OH
 2014: Philadelphia, PA
 2015: San Diego, CA
 2016: San Francisco, CA
 2017: Portsmouth, NH
 2018: Charleston, SC

Current members 
 Athenaeum Music & Arts Library founded 1899 
 The Athenaeum of Philadelphia founded 1814
 The Boston Athenaeum founded 1807
 The Charleston Library Society founded 1748
 The Institute Library founded 1826 
 The Lanier Library founded 1890 
 The Mechanics'Hall/MCMA Library founded 1815 
 The Mechanics' Institute Library, San Francisco founded 1854 
 The Mercantile Library, Cincinnati founded 1835 
 The Mercantile Library Center for Fiction founded 1820
 The New York Society Library founded 1754 
 The Portsmouth Athenaeum founded 1817 
 The Providence Athenaeum founded 1836 
 Redwood Library & Athenaeum founded 1747 
 The Salem Athenaeum founded 1810 
 Timrod Literary and Library Association founded 1897
 
Associate Members
 The General Society Library founded 1820 
 The Library Company of Philadelphia founded 1731 
 The Minneapolis Athenaeum founded 1866 
 St. Johnsbury Athenaeum founded 1871
 The St. Louis Mercantile Library Association founded 1846
 Folio: The Seattle Athenaeum, founded 2015

References 

Library consortia in the United States
1991 establishments in the United States